Each team in the 2016 FIFA Club World Cup had to name a 23-man squad (three of whom must be goalkeepers). Injury replacements were allowed until 24 hours before the team's first match.

América
Manager:  Ricardo La Volpe

Atlético Nacional
Atlético Nacional named their squad on 1 December 2016. Andrés Ibargüen withdrew due to injury and was replaced by Cristián Dajome.

Manager:  Reinaldo Rueda

Auckland City
Auckland City named their squad on 29 November 2016.

Manager:  Ramon Tribulietx

Jeonbuk Hyundai Motors
Manager:  Choi Kang-hee

Kashima Antlers
Manager:  Masatada Ishii

Mamelodi Sundowns
Manager:  Pitso Mosimane

Real Madrid 
Manager:  Zinedine Zidane

References

External links
 Official FIFA Club World Cup website
 Official squads (as of 4 December 2016), FIFA.com

Squads
FIFA Club World Cup squads